Visa requirements for New Zealand citizens are administrative entry restrictions by the authorities of other states placed on citizens of New Zealand.  New Zealand citizens had visa-free or visa on arrival access to 187 countries and territories, ranking the New Zealand passport 7th in terms of travel freedom according to the Henley Passport Index.

Visa requirements map

Visa requirements

Dependent and associated territories of New Zealand
NB: Cook Islands and Niue are not dependent territories of NZ, they are in Free Association with New Zealand

Dependent, disputed, or restricted territories

Unrecognised or partially recognised countries

Dependent and autonomous territories

Other territories

Additional rules

Visa exemptions for Schengen states

A stay in the Schengen Area as a whole of up to 3 months

New Zealand citizens are classified as 'Annex II' foreign nationals, and so are permitted to stay visa-free in the 26 member states of the Schengen Area as a whole — rather than each country individually — for a period not exceeding 3 months every 6 months.

A stay in the Schengen Area as a whole of more than 3 months (but no more than 3 months in any individual member state)

The New Zealand Government has signed bilateral visa waiver agreements with a number of the individual countries who are Schengen signatories, which allow New Zealand citizens to spend up to three months in the relevant country, without reference to time spent in other Schengen signatory states. Since these agreements continue to remain valid despite the implementation of the Schengen agreement, the European Commission has confirmed that in practice if New Zealanders visit Schengen countries which have signed these types of bilateral agreements with New Zealand, then the terms of these agreements override the conditions normally imposed as a result of the Schengen visa exemption agreement.

New Zealand has individual bilateral visa waiver agreements with the following Schengen signatories:

Consequently, New Zealand citizens can visit the above Schengen member states visa-free for periods of up to 3 months in each country.  If, however, a New Zealand citizen then visits another Schengen state not included in the list above, the restriction of no more than 3 months out of a 6-month period in the Schengen area as a whole applies.  Therefore, if a New Zealand citizen has already spent 3 months in one or more of the above Schengen countries, any visits to another Schengen country without a bilateral visa waiver agreement with New Zealand may lead to difficulties with local law enforcement agencies (e.g. being accused of having overstayed upon leaving a Schengen country which is not in the list above).

In addition, a New Zealand citizen who has already spent up to 3 months in other parts of the Schengen Area can enter Hungary and remain there for up to a further 90 days visa-free. Following the stay in Hungary, if 3 months has already spent elsewhere in the Schengen area, he/she must then leave the Schengen area from Hungary and go directly to a country outside the Schengen Area.

A stay in the Schengen Area as a whole of more than 3 months (and more than 3 months in an individual member state)

In general, any person who is not a European Union, European Economic Area or Swiss citizen and who wishes to stay in a Schengen member state for more than 3 months is required to obtain a national long-stay 'D' visa and/or a residence permit. New Zealand citizens aged 18–30 (or 18–35 in some cases) are able to obtain a national long-stay 'D' visa and/or a residence permit from 19 Schengen member states on the basis of a working holiday (see below). Schengen member states also issue national long-stay 'D' visas and residence permits for other reasons to those fulfilling criteria laid out in their national immigration policies (e.g. skilled workers, students, au pair).

In general, the national long-stay 'D' visa/residence permit needs to be obtained in advance through the member state's embassy/consulate. However, some Schengen member states offer exceptions for New Zealand citizens.

 allows New Zealand citizens to enter the country without a visa and to apply for a temporary residence permit or a 'Red-White-Red Card' (issued to permanent immigrants) after arrival, rather than in advance through an Austrian embassy/consulate.

The  allows New Zealand citizens to apply for a work visa under a special scheme known as a 'Green Card' (rather than a 'Blue Card' or work permit which is required by most non-EU citizens). The application for a Green Card can be lodged at any Czech embassy/consulate (or, in some circumstances, within the Czech Republic if the applicant is already resident there) and is usually processed within 60 days.

As of 24 June 2014, it is no longer possible to apply for a green card. This type of permit was replaced

 permits New Zealand citizens intending to stay in the country for over 3 months to enter Denmark without a visa and to apply for a residence or work permit (excluding a working holiday residence permit) after arrival (whilst for many other non-EEA and Swiss citizens, an application for a residence permit and visa for a stay over 3 months must be lodged in advance at a Danish foreign mission). This is particularly useful as there is no Danish embassy or consulate in New Zealand that accepts residence or work permit applications - the nearest one is in Canberra in Australia.

 permits New Zealand citizens to stay and work in Estonia for more than 90 days but less than 6 months as long as they obtain a category 'D' long-stay visa at a cost of €80 in advance at an Estonian foreign mission after the employer has completed a 'registration of short-term employment'. New Zealand citizens intending to stay and work in Estonia for more than 6 months can apply for a temporary residence permit for employment after arrival in the country.

 permits New Zealand citizens intending to stay in the country for over 3 months to enter without a visa and to apply for a residence permit after arrival (whilst for many other non-EEA and Swiss citizens, a residence permit and visa for a stay over 3 months must be applied for in advance at a German foreign mission).

 allows New Zealand citizens who wish to stay for more than 90 days in the country to apply for a residence card from the regional directorate of the Office of Immigration and Nationality within 90 days of arrival and do not need to obtain a residence permit prior to arrival in Hungary (unlike most other non-EEA and Swiss foreign nationals). Family members (who are not New Zealand citizens) accompanying New Zealand citizens can apply for a residence permit after arriving in Hungary. For example, if a New Zealand citizen wishes to move to Hungary with her husband and her daughter (who are both Samoan citizens and not New Zealand citizens), all three of them can apply for a Hungarian residence permit after arriving in Hungary (although the husband and daughter will have to apply for a Schengen visa prior to travelling to Hungary).

 permits new Zealand citizens intending to stay in the country for over 3 months as self-employed persons or as businesspersons to enter Latvia without a visa and to apply for a residence permit after arrival (whilst for many non-EEA and Swiss citizens, an application for a residence permit must be lodged in advance at a Latvian foreign mission).

 exempts New Zealand citizens from the requirement to obtain a Schengen category "D" visa (the visa issued for long term stays in The Netherlands of over 90 days, known in Dutch as the "MVV" visa) - an exemption which goes beyond the visa waiver afforded to most other non-EEA and non-Swiss foreign nationals who are usually only given a visa waiver of up to 90 days in a 180-day period.

 permits New Zealand citizens who have qualifications as a skilled worker to stay in the country without a visa for up to 6 months to seek employment as a skilled worker or a specialist (except as a religious leader/teacher or an ethnic cook), as long as they register with the police within 3 months of arriving in Norway.

 permits New Zealand citizens intending to stay in the country for over 3 months to enter Slovakia without a visa and to apply for a residence permit (excluding a working holiday residence permit) after arrival (whilst for many other non-EEA and Swiss citizens, an application for a residence permit and visa for a stay over 3 months must be lodged in advance at a Slovak foreign mission).

 offers New Zealand citizens a more generous visa exemption than that which Schengen rules normally provide for.  Not only are New Zealand citizens able to spend 3 months visa-free in Switzerland, they can also stay for over 3 months (i.e. without time limit) without the need to apply for a visa.  However, at a cantonal level, individual cantonal migration authorities may impose further requirements, such as the need to register for a residence permit, if a New Zealand citizen wants to take up employment or reside for over 3 months, in which case a residence permit must be applied for before entry to Switzerland.

Visa exemptions and requirements for the United Kingdom
New Zealand citizens are able to visit the United Kingdom for up to 6 months (or 3 months if they enter from the Republic of Ireland) without the need to apply for a visa as long as they fulfil all of the following criteria:
 they do not work during their stay in the UK
 they must not register a marriage or register a civil partnership during their stay in the UK
 they are able to present evidence of sufficient money to fund their stay in the UK (if requested by the border inspection officer)
 they intend to leave the UK at the end of their visit and can meet the cost of their return or onward journey
 if under the age of 18, they can demonstrate evidence of suitable care arrangements and parental (or guardian's) consent for their stay in the UK

However, even though, strictly speaking, they are not required to apply for a visa if they satisfy all of the above criteria, New Zealand citizens who fall into any of the following categories have been strongly advised by the UK Border Agency (replaced by UK Visas and Immigration) to apply for a visa prior to travelling to the UK if:
 they have any unspent criminal convictions in any country
 they have previously been refused entry or breached the terms of any entry to the UK, or been deported or otherwise removed from the UK
 they have previously applied for a visa and been refused one
 they have been warned by a UK official that they should obtain a visa before travelling to the UK

New Zealand citizens who were born before 1983 and qualify for right of abode are able to live and work in the United Kingdom indefinitely.

New Zealand citizens with a grandparent born either in the United Kingdom, Channel Islands or Isle of Man at any time or in the Republic of Ireland on or before 31 March 1922 can apply for UK Ancestry Entry Clearance, which enables them to work in the UK for 5 years, after which they can apply to settle indefinitely.

New Zealand citizens aged 18 to 30 can apply for a Youth Mobility Scheme visa which allows them to pursue a working holiday in the UK for 2 years.

New Zealand citizens can study in the United Kingdom for up to 6 months as a student visitor without the need to apply for a visa as long as they do not work during this period. If attending a course which is longer than 6 months, New Zealand citizens can apply for a Tier 4 student visa in New Zealand or in the UK merely by completing the application form, quoting the Confirmation of Acceptance for Studies (CAS) reference number issued to them by their UK education provider and presenting evidence of care arrangements (if under the age of 18); they do not need to submit proof of sufficient funds, qualifications or English language ability (which most other foreign nationals need to demonstrate) as long as the UK education provider is recognised as a 'Highly Trusted' sponsor by the UK Border Agency. However, the UK Border Agency reserves the right to request such evidence in particular situations and New Zealand citizens must still present such evidence if applying for a Tier 4 student visa outside New Zealand or the UK. New Zealand citizens who have been issued with a Tier 4 student visa (but not those who are in the UK as student visitors) can work in the UK for up to 20 hours per week during term-time and without time restrictions outside term-time.

Visa exemption for Australia
By virtue of the Trans-Tasman Travel Arrangement, New Zealand citizens are granted a Special Category Visa on arrival in Australia (which permits residence and work for an indefinite period) as long as:
 they present a valid New Zealand passport
 they have no criminal convictions
 they have no untreated tuberculosis
 they have not been deported, excluded or removed from any country

The same privilege is extended to Australian citizens and PR holders.

APEC Business Travel Card

Holders of an APEC Business Travel Card (ABTC)  travelling on business do not require a visa to the following countries:

1 – up to 90 days
2 – up to 60 days
3 – up to 59 days

The card must be used in conjunction with a passport and has the following advantages:
undertake legitimate business in participating economies
expedited border crossing in all member economies, including transitional members
expedited scheduling of visa interview (United States)

Non-visa restrictions

Consular protection of New Zealand citizens abroad

See List of diplomatic missions of New Zealand.

Foreign travel statistics

See also

 Visa policy of New Zealand
 New Zealand passport

Notes

References
 

New Zealand
Foreign relations of New Zealand